Go! Cartoons, stylized as GO! Cartoons, is a series of animated shorts produced by Frederator Studios and Sony Pictures Animation. The series premiered on November 7, 2017, with the short The Summoning. It features 12 shorts, airing on VRV and Cartoon Hangover's YouTube channel. Go! Cartoons is Frederator Studios' sixth cartoon "incubator" series since 1998.

Description 
Go! Cartoons showcases animated shorts and is designed to find "tomorrow’s cartoon hitmakers". Each cartoon short can act as a pilot, with the most successful cartoons having an opportunity to be produced as a full series on Cartoon Hangover or elsewhere. Several animated television series have started in similar incubator-type formats, including Adventure Time and Bee and PuppyCat.

The project began in 2014 when Frederator Studios and Sony Pictures Animation called for pitches from animators around the world. Twelve five-minute shorts were produced, and one would become a limited series on Cartoon Hangover. As of November 19, 2022, none of the shorts have become a series.

Filmography

List of episodes 

}}

See also 
 Wow Unlimited Media, a Canadian-American animation organization and Frederator Networks, Inc. holding company.
 Bee and PuppyCat, a cartoon series that started as an animated short from Frederator Studios.

References 

2017 web series debuts
American adult animated web series
American adult animation anthology series
Frederator Studios
Television series by Sony Pictures Animation
Television series by Sony Pictures Television
2010s YouTube series